Mayar Sherif was the defending champion and successfully defended her title, defeating Bernarda Pera in the final, 6–2, 6–4.

Seeds

Draw

Finals

Top half

Bottom half

References

External Links
Draw

2022 WTA 125 tournaments